Jacob Scott Jones (born 30 December) better known as iakopo (pronunciation: yah-koh-po) is an international recording artist. Until 2010, he performed as "Keys of Creation" before starting his career as a solo artist and officially recording and performing music under the name iakopo.

Life and career

Early life 
The second of six children born into a strict Mormon family, iakopo's journey started in Fountain Valley, California. During his formative years, iakopo was sent to the all boys facility, Paradise Cove Academy in Western Samoa. With such a diverse beginning, iakopo begin to flourish greatly in Samoa, ultimately being adopted by a Samoan family. As he adapted to island life, iakopo discovered a passion for nature and singing. While attending Pesega Church College in Western Samoa, iakopo sang with a local reggae band, covering Top 40 music.

iakopo said about this time: Samoan culture taught me a lot about life and respect. It also helped nurture my vibe.

2000–2005: Growing as an artist 
After graduating high school in 2000, iakopo left Samoa and returned to the US. As he brought his passion for music with him, iakopo started making demos, as well as selling mixtapes on the streets of cities across America. This led to him gaining credibility in the underground grassroots community under the name "Rein Free". In 2004 he self-released an album called Realization under that name. The underground success of this album led to his first record deal offer in 2005. He refused that deal, choosing instead to rename himself Keys of Creation and release a new album called Let Your Light Shine.

2006–2010: Keys of Creation – Let Your Light Shine and Born To Win 
Let Your Light Shine was influenced by artists such as Bob Marley. It was released by iakopo independently on 12 December 2006. The singles "Let Your Light Shine" and "Love Jah" made it to the top of reggae charts in the US, Hawaii, Polynesia, Asia and Europe. This success led to a record deal with 1980Entertainment, as well as iakopo sharing the stage with many influential reggae artists. After an independent tour throughout Hawaii and West Coast America in 2007, he co-headlined the Summer Massive Tour in 2008, alongside Tribal Seeds. He also was the opening act for Half Pint's 2008 concert in World Beat Center, San Diego, CA. In 2009 he toured as support for Israel Vibrations, Junior Reid, Midnite, Collie Buddz and Messenga Selah.

While touring, he wrote the album Born To Win. On this, iakopo focused on his island roots, as can be heard on the single "Heart of Polynesia". This single was another No. 1 hit on Hawaiian radio stations, as well as winning the International Music Video Award for World Music 2008. A dispute led to iakopo splitting with his label and deciding to start writing music under his own name.

2011 – 2014: iakopo – 808 Maui, Singles and One Forever 
iakopo moved to Japan in 2010, after meeting his new manager in Maui, Hawaii. His manager put him in contact with Universal Music Japan, who signed him for the compilation CD 808 Maui. It contains four of iakopo's songs, including the single "By My Side" whose ‘Fallen’ riddim was produced by Citizen K and made it to the top of reggae charts in the UK.
iakopo also released another song with Citizen K called "Be with me" on the 'Blindfold' riddim on 20 November 2011. The riddim is still a top featured one on fiweh as of 2 April 2012. Universal also arranged a collaboration between iakopo and Infinity 16, which resulted in the single "Bounce", released 28 September 2011. The single sold 7,000 units on the release day, was the No. 1 sold single in Japan for 2 weeks and No. 1 on the Japanese mobile download charts.

iakopo started his own label LionzShare.

On 12 December 2011 iakopo released his first single on LionzShare called 'FLY'. It was the No. 1 featured single on reggaezion for the whole first month after its release. This was followed on 2 February 2012 by 'VIP'.

His released the single "Remedy" on 26 March 2012. It was produced by Citizen K and has backing vocals by Fiona. The single was featured on a number of blogs and is iakopo's first single with an official video. 'Remedy' reached #2 on Betelnutradio.com. iakopo has also been featured and interviewed on LionsFace Radio from Amsterdam.

His follow-up single "Hot Summer" was released 18 June 2012. Written by iakopo and produced by Soren 'Cash' Petersen at the LionzShare Studio. As of 30 August 2012, it was featured on the Pacific Top 20 for 4 weeks in a row and reached No. 5.

Between 2013 and 2014, iakopo focused solely on music and introducing his style to the world. In 2013, iakopo launched his annual event "Island Fever" which brings a mix of Reggae and Environmentalism to Tokyo. After the success of "Island Fever", iakopo toured Hawaii in the summer of 2013. Following his return to Japan, singles "I Believe" and "When I See You Smile" (ft Kalisi) were released.
By 2014, iakopo returned solidly to the studio to prepare for his fourth album. Releasing chart topping singles such as "One Forever", "Whatcha Say" and "Tonite". To date the videos for "Tonite" and "One Forever" (which is also the title track) have garnered over 2 million views on YouTube and growing. In October 2014, iakopo officially released the One Forever album.

2015 - present 
2015 greeted iakopo with his biggest journey since his move to Japan, a career enlightening trip to Jamaica. After spending years in Japan under Universal, iakopo took to Jamaica on a musical exploration. As an avid lover and artist of Reggae Music, iakopo immersed himself with in the culture and raw sound present in the island of Jamaica.

Teaming up with Gramps Morgan of Morgan Heritage, iakopo released the single "Supernatural". iakopo remains in Jamaica, partnering with Stylez of Blaze Ent Records alongside some of Jamaica's top producers, and working on his  album The Introduction.

iakopo teamed up with Rvssian, the famous Jamaican dancehall producer, and created a hit song titled Touch Down featuring Shaggy. the song entered the U.S. Billboard dance charts top 100 debut at 41 and was the fastest bullet to #31 on the U.S. Billboard Dance Charts.

Discography

Awards
 International Music Video Awards Best World Music Video 'Heart of Polynesia’
 Billboard Top 40 Dance 'Touch Down'

External links 

 Instagram: @iakopomusic
 Twitter: @iakopomusic
 Youtube Official Channel:  iakopoMusic
 Youtube Daily Channel: iakopoDaily
 SoundCloud: iakopo

References 

Samoan musicians
American reggae musicians
Living people
Year of birth missing (living people)